Christian Hemmi (born 23 August 1954) is a former Swiss alpine skier.

He is the brother of Heini Hemmi.

Career
During his career he has achieved 3 results among the top 3 in the World Cup.

World Cup results
Top 3

References

External links
 
 

1954 births
Living people
Swiss male alpine skiers
20th-century Swiss people